Jeremy Thomas Camp (born January 12, 1978) is an American contemporary Christian music singer and songwriter from Lafayette, Indiana. He has released eleven albums, four of them RIAA-certified as Gold, and two live albums. Camp's original music is a mixture of ballads and up-tempo songs with rock influence. He has won five GMA Dove Awards, has been nominated for three American Music Awards, and was nominated for a Grammy Award for Best Pop/Contemporary Gospel Album in 2010 for his album, Speaking Louder Than Before. I Still Believe, a film based on Camp's first marriage, was released in 2020, with Camp being played by New Zealand actor KJ Apa.

Early life

Jeremy Camp was born in Lafayette, Indiana. His father Tom, the pastor at Harvest Chapel (associated with Calvary Chapel Costa Mesa), taught him how to play guitar. After completing high school, Camp attended Calvary Chapel Bible College in Murrieta, California, for two years and earned an associate of theology degree and was ordained a minister. After one of the worship leaders heard him play in the kitchen of the school, he urged Camp to become a part of the worship team. Soon, he led worship and played all over Southern California.

Career

2000s
His first independent album "Burden Me" was released in 2000. In 2002, he produced his first label album "Stay" with BEC Recordings.

Camp has scored 32 No. 1 hits on Christian Radio across all formats (Contemporary Hit Radio, Hot AC, Rock, and Inspirational Charts). His album Beyond Measure contributed six back-to-back No. 1 hits, including the track "Let It Fade" which held the No 1. spot for 10 weeks on AC Radio. His first single was "Understand". He has made ten music videos: "Understand", "Walk by Faith", "Take You Back", "Tonight", "Give You Glory", "Let It Fade", "I Am Willing" (a song that was not included on any of his albums), "Speaking Louder Than Before", "The Way", and "Reckless".

Camp scored Christian music top spots for "Take You Back" and "Lay Down My Pride". He also was voted the Best Male Artist in the 2005 Reader's Choice Music Awards in the Christianity Today magazine. Camp was also ASCAP 2005 Songwriter of the Year and won the Dove Award for the Male Vocalist of the Year for the second consecutive year. In 2005, he recorded the song "Open Up Your Eyes" for the compilation release Music Inspired by the Chronicles of Narnia: The Lion, the Witch, and the Wardrobe, a September 2005 album which contained original songs written by various Christian artists for the 2005 film The Chronicles of Narnia: The Lion, the Witch, and the Wardrobe. Camp closed the year with both Stay and Carried Me: the Worship Project being RIAA-certified as Gold.

Camp earned the top honors at the Twenty-Eighth Annual ASCAP Music Awards, winning the Songwriter of the Year award ("Take You Back" and "This Man"). "Take You Back" also earned him the Song of the Year award. Camp won two 2006 CCM Reader's Choice Awards, for Favorite Artist and Favorite Male Artist. He took part in the Dove award for Special Event Album of the Year, which went to Music Inspired by The Chronicles of Narnia: The Lion, the Witch and the Wardrobe. He released a special edition of his hit album, Restored. Four new songs were included on Restored: The Deluxe Gold Edition as well as a letter to his fans.

Camp went back into the studio to record Beyond Measure in early 2006 and was released on October 31, 2006. Camp is also credited as producer for his wife's album, Don't Wait, which was released in September 2006. "Tonight", the first single from the album Beyond Measure, was released in mid-August, and eventually hit No. 1 on Christian contemporary hit radio. It was the 11th most played single on HR stations in 2007. "Give Me Jesus," the third single off "Beyond Measure," made it into the top 5 on Inspirational radio. The fourth single, "Give You Glory," debuted on Jewish AJ radio at No. 16. His song "Let It Fade" was the seventh most played song on HR radio in 2007. That year he also released a two-disc (CD and DVD) for his concert tour "Live Unplugged" recorded in Franklin, Tennessee.

His song "No Matter What" was the 4th most-played song on R&R magazine's Christian CHR chart for 2008.
He also came out with his new studio album Speaking Louder Than Before, containing the hit lead single "There Will Be a Day". On November 17, 2009, Camp released another live album: Jeremy Camp Live. This album featured songs from all albums to date. His Speaking Louder Than Before received his first Grammy nomination.

2010s
Beyond Measure was certified as Gold by the RIAA. The worship album We Cry Out was released on August 24, 2010. Camp was also a judge for the 10th annual Independent Music Awards to support independent artists' careers.

On May 20, 2011, Camp released his first book, I Still Believe. The book is about Camp's life, illuminating his childhood, the death of his first wife, and where he believes God has brought him.

Reckless was released on February 12, 2013. This is Camp's first studio album since 2008, when he released Speaking Louder Than Before. The first single released from the album was the title track, "Reckless". A video accompanied the single in February 2013. "Reckless" was followed by his second single "My God", which reached number 5 on the Christian Songs Chart. He also released an acoustic video of "My God" to his Vevo Channel in 2013.

Camp released his tenth studio album, I Will Follow, on February 3, 2015. The album's lead single, "He Knows", was released in September 2014.

Camp released his eleventh studio album, The Answer, on October 6, 2017. The album's lead single, "Word of Life", was released in June 2017.

Personal life
Camp and his first wife, Melissa Lynn Henning-Camp (born October 7, 1979), were married on October 21, 2000. She was diagnosed with ovarian cancer and died on February 5, 2001, when he was 23 and she was 21. Some of his early songs reflect the emotional ordeal of her illness. "I Still Believe" was the first song he wrote. "Walk by Faith" was written during their honeymoon. A film based on Camp's romance with Melissa, I Still Believe, was released in March 2020, with Camp's role being played by KJ Apa and the role of Melissa being played by Britt Robertson.

On December 15, 2003, he married Adrienne Liesching, former frontwoman for The Benjamin Gate. They have three children.

In the media
He was played by New Zealand actor KJ Apa in the 2020 biographical musical film I Still Believe, which received mixed reviews.

Discography

 Burden Me (2000)
 Stay (2002)
 Carried Me: The Worship Project (2004)
 Restored (2004)
 Beyond Measure (2006)
 Speaking Louder Than Before (2008)
 We Cry Out: The Worship Project (2010)
 Christmas: God With Us (2012)
 Reckless (2013)
 I Will Follow (2015)
 The Answer (2017)
 The Story's Not Over (2019)
 When You Speak (2021)

Awards and nominations

GMA Dove Awards

Other

References

External links
 
Jeremy Camp on PureVolume

 

1978 births
Living people
American performers of Christian music
BEC Recordings artists
Singers from Indiana
People from Lafayette, Indiana
People from Tippecanoe County, Indiana
Songwriters from Indiana
21st-century American male singers
21st-century American singers
American male songwriters
American Christians